Ian Crawford Eddy (10 June 1906 – 30 December 1976), was a decorated American submarine commander during World War II who reached the rank of Rear Admiral in the United States Navy.

Military career

Naval Academy 
Ian Crawford Eddy graduated from Annapolis with the class of 1930.  He was a Letterwinner in football playing Right Guard on the 1929 "Navy Eleven" team.

Promotions

Ensign, 9 June 1933

Lieutenant 30 Jun 1938

Lieutenant Commander (T) 15 Jun 1942

Commander (T) 15 Oct 1942

Captain (T) 15 Nov 1945

Commands
 
Under Instruction United States Naval Academy 1 Jan 1939

Duty USS S-44 (SS-155) 1 Jul 1939 - 1 Oct 1939

Captain USS S-45 (SS-156) 29 May 1940 - 30 Sep 1942

Captain USS Pargo (SS-264) 26 Apr 1943 - 9 Aug 1944

Flag Lieutenant and Personnel Officer Commander Submarines Atlantic Fleet Sep 1944 - Sep 1945

(Acting?) Chief of Staff Commander Submarines Atlantic Fleet May 1945

Executive Officer, Department of Marine Engineering, United States Naval Academy, 1949

Director of Athletics, United States Naval Academy, 1951-1954

References

External links 
 Burial Site at Findagrave.com

1906 births
1976 deaths
United States Navy rear admirals (upper half)
United States Naval Academy alumni
United States Navy personnel of World War II
Recipients of the Navy Cross (United States)
People from Saratoga Springs, New York